Christian Dürr (born 18 April 1977) is a German politician of the Free Democratic Party (FDP) who has been serving as a member of the Bundestag since 2017. Since December 2021 he has been leader of the FDP parliamentary group in the Bundestag.

Early life and education
Dürr was born in Delmenhorst. He graduated in economics from Leibniz University Hannover, with a thesis on emissions trading.

Political career

Career in state politics
Dürr was first elected to the Lower Saxon Landtag in the 2003 state elections. He was his parliamentary group's spokesperson on environmental policy (2003–2009) and media policy (2013–2017). Between 2009 and 2017, he served as chairman of the parliamentary group; in this role, he succeeded Jörg Bode.

Member of the German Parliament, 2017–present
Dürr has been a member of the German Bundestag since the 2017 elections, representing the Delmenhorst – Wesermarsch – Oldenburg-Land district. Within his parliamentary group, he chaired the Bundestag group of FDP parliamentarians from Lower Saxony, Hamburg and Schleswig-Holstein. He also served as one of six deputy chairpersons of the FDP parliamentary group under the leadership of its chairman Christian Lindner, where he oversaw the group's activities on finance and budget policy.

Ahead of the 2021 elections, Dürr was elected to lead the FDP's campaign in Lower Saxony.

In the negotiations to form a so-called traffic light coalition of the Social Democrats (SPD), the Green Party and the FDP following the 2021 federal elections, Dürr led his party's delegation in the working group on financial regulation and the national budget; his co-chairs from the other parties are Doris Ahnen and Lisa Paus.

In December 2020, he was elected leader of the FDP parliamentary group in the Bundestag, succeeding Christian Lindner.

In January 2022, he told business magazine Wirtschaftswoche that Germany needs to attract 400,000 foreign workers a year.

Other activities

Government agencies
 Institute for Federal Real Estate (BImA), Member of the Supervisory Board (since 2018)

Corporate boards
 Universum AG, Member of the Supervisory Board

Non-profits
 Bundesverband der Unternehmervereinigungen (BUV), Member of the Advisory Board
 SV Werder Bremen, Member

Personal life
Dürr is married and has two children. The family lives in Ganderkesee.

References

External links
Official website

Members of the Landtag of Lower Saxony
1977 births
Living people
Members of the Bundestag 2017–2021
Members of the Bundestag 2021–2025
Members of the Bundestag for the Free Democratic Party (Germany)